Gudzowaty is a Polish language surname. It may refer to:

Aleksander Gudzowaty (1938-2013), Polish businessman
Melody Gudzowaty (born 1989),  Dominican-Spanish model
Tomasz Gudzowaty (born 1971), Polish documentary, portrait and art photographer

Polish-language surnames